Menocal may refer to:

Armando Menocal (1863–1942), Cuban painter
Manuel Hilario de Céspedes y García Menocal (b. 1944), Cuban clergyman
María Rosa Menocal (1953–2012), Cuban-born scholar of medieval culture and history who resided in the United States
Mario García Menocal (1866–1941), President of Cuba from 1913 to 1921
Serafín García Menocal, President of the National Council of the Asociación de Scouts de Cuba in the 1950s.